Benton County is a county in the south-central portion of the U.S. state of Washington. As of the 2020 census, its population was 206,873. The county seat is Prosser, and its largest city is Kennewick. The Columbia River demarcates the county's north, south, and east boundaries.

Benton County was created from what were then larger versions of Klickitat County and Yakima County on March 8, 1905, and was named after Missouri statesman Thomas Hart Benton.

Geography
The highest point of land elevation within the county is the summit of Rattlesnake Mountain at 3,527 feet; and the lowest point of land elevation is along the southwestern shore of Crow Butte at 265 feet (fluctuates due to level of Columbia River).

Waterways
Columbia River - Surrounds and forms the county's boundary on three sides.  Barge trafficking is possible upriver to anchorage sites in northern Richland, the upstream extent of Lake Wallula which forms behind McNary Dam.
Yakima River - Bisects the county from west to east, emptying into the Columbia River at Richland.  As a water source, the Yakima is the lifesource for agriculture in the Yakima Valley.  A shallow river, the Yakima is suitably navigable only for small, personal watercraft.  Historically, the Yakima River supported some of the most bountiful migratory fish populations in the entire Columbia Basin, and many of those legendary salmon runs are now rebounding after decades of demise.  Amon Creek is the most notable tributary of the Yakima River in Benton County, emptying into the mainstem river near the Yakima River Delta in Richland.

Mountains and ridges
Horse Heaven Hills
Rattlesnake Hills
Lookout Summit
Rattlesnake Mountain
Jump Off Joe
Badger Mountain
Candy Mountain
Red Mountain

Adjacent counties
Grant County - north
Franklin County - northeast
Walla Walla County - east
Umatilla County, Oregon - southeast
Morrow County, Oregon - southwest
Klickitat County - southwest
Yakima County - west

National Protected Areas
 Hanford Reach National Monument (part)
 Manhattan Project National Historical Park (part)
 Saddle Mountain National Wildlife Refuge (part)
 Umatilla National Wildlife Refuge (part)

Major highways
 Interstate 82
 Interstate 182
 U.S. Route 12
 U.S. Route 395
 Washington State Route 14
 Washington State Route 240
 Washington State Route 397

Demographics

2000 census
As of the census of 2000, there were 142,475 people, 52,866 households, and 38,063 families residing in the county.  The population density was 84 people per square mile (32/km2).  There were 55,963 housing units at an average density of 33 per square mile (13/km2).  The racial makeup of the county was 86.2% White, 0.9% Black or African American, 0.8% Native American, 2.2% Asian, 0.1% Pacific Islander, 7.0% from other races, and 2.7% from two or more races.  12.5% of the population were Hispanic or Latino of any race. 18.1% were of German, 11.0% English, 9.1% United States or American and 8.4% Irish ancestry. 86.4% spoke English and 10.3% Spanish as their first language.

There were 52,866 households, out of which 38.20% had children under the age of 18 living with them, 57.60% were married couples living together, 10.20% had a female householder with no husband present, and 28.00% were non-families. 23.20% of all households were made up of individuals, and 7.70% had someone living alone who was 65 years of age or older.  The average household size was 2.68 and the average family size was 3.17.

In the county, the population was spread out, with 29.70% under the age of 18, 8.60% from 18 to 24, 28.50% from 25 to 44, 22.90% from 45 to 64, and 10.30% who were 65 years of age or older.  The median age was 34 years. For every 100 females there were 98.70 males.  For every 100 females age 18 and over, there were 96.30 males.

The median income for a household in the county was $47,044, and the median income for a family was $54,146. Males had a median income of $45,556 versus $27,232 for females. The per capita income for the county was $21,301.  About 7.80% of families and 10.30% of the population were below the poverty line, including 14.30% of those under age 18 and 6.90% of those age 65 or over.

2010 census
As of the 2010 census, there were 175,177 people, 65,304 households, and 45,699 families residing in the county. The racial makeup of the county was 82.4% white, 2.7% Asian, 1.3% black or African American, 0.9% American Indian, 0.1% Pacific islander, 9.0% from other races, and 3.6% from two or more races. Those of Hispanic or Latino origin made up 18.7% of the population. In terms of ancestry, 22.3% were German, 13.4% were English, 12.5% were Irish, and 7.9% were American.

Of the 65,304 households, 36.4% had children under the age of 18 living with them, 53.8% were married couples living together, 11.1% had a female householder with no husband present, 30.0% were non-families, and 24.3% of all households were made up of individuals. The average household size was 2.66 and the average family size was 3.17. The median age was 35.6 years.

The median income for a household in the county was $57,354 and the median income for a family was $69,834. Males had a median income of $57,496 versus $36,575 for females. The per capita income for the county was $27,161. About 9.3% of families and 12.7% of the population were below the poverty line, including 19.3% of those under age 18 and 6.1% of those age 65 or over.

Government
Benton County is one of the 33 counties in Washington that operates under the non-chartered "commission" or "plural executive" form of government.  Three commissioners share administrative aegis with several other partisan officials independently elected to four-year terms of office.  Judges of the superior court are also independently elected.  In Benton County, the commissioners appoint a county administrator to oversee all departments that do not fall under other elected officials.
Commissioner (District 1) - Jerome Delvin
Commissioner (District 2) - Michael Alvarez
Commissioner (District 3) - Will McKay

The County government is seated in Prosser, with many departments having satellite and auxiliary offices and facilities in Richland, Kennewick, and elsewhere. An attempt to move the county seat from Prosser to Kennewick resulted in a November 1984 ballot measure, which had 54.4 percent approval but failed to meet the required 60 percent threshold.

There are five incorporated cities within Benton County.  The two larger cities—Kennewick and Richland—employ the "council-manager" form of government where the mayor is elected from the city council and serves a more ceremonial role, whereby direct administration of the city is the responsibility of the city manager.  The three smaller cities—Benton City, Prosser, and West Richland—use the "mayor-council" form of government where the mayor is the chief administrator of the city and is directly elected by the citizens.  In Washington, a majority of cities use the mayor-council form, but the council-manager structure is common among medium-sized municipalities.

Numerous special purpose districts with varying degrees of taxing and administrative authority such as port authorities and school districts oversee local responsibilities that are not a part of county or city governance.

Education
Benton County is serviced by six public school districts and a few smaller private schools.

Public education
Delta High School, located in Pasco, is a public high school specializing in the "STEM" fields of study (science, technology, engineering, mathematics).  Delta High School is a collaborative venture of the Kennewick, Pasco, and Richland school districts, and is located in neighboring Franklin County, Washington.  Prosser High School is located much closer to the county seat of Benton County.

Higher education
Two public college branch campuses are located in Benton County, each in Richland:
Columbia Basin College - CBC is a community college conferring associates, transfer, and baccalaureate degrees with its main campus located in Pasco and a branch campus co-located with Delta High School in central Richland.
Washington State University Tri-Cities - WSUTC is a branch of the Washington State University system based in Pullman, with a growing campus located in North Richland near the Pacific Northwest National Laboratory.

Recreation
The Tri-City area's favorable climate, generally lower costs of living, and central location within a four-hour drive of the Seattle, Portland, Boise, and Spokane metropolitan areas has made it a popular destination for conferences, sports tournaments, festivals, agri-tourism, and other attractions.

Golf courses
Benton County is home to seven publicly accessible golf courses:
Canyon Lakes (Kennewick) – 7,026 yards | 73.8 / 131
Columbia Park (Kennewick) – 2,447 yards | note: "par 3"
Zintel Creek Golf Club (Kennewick) – 4,900 yards | 63.9 / 115 | note: semi-private
Buckskin (Richland) - note: 9 holes
Columbia Point (Richland) – 6,571 yards | 71.2 / 128 | note: municipal
Horn Rapids (Richland) – 7,060 yards | 74.0 / 139
West Richland (West Richland) – 6,014 yards
A private golf and country club, Meadow Springs, is also located in Richland.

Museums
 Benton County Historical Museum
 East Benton County Historical Museum
 Hanford Reach Interpretive Center

Sports
The Tri-City Americans are a major junior hockey team and are a founding member of the Western Hockey League and play at the Toyota Center. The Americans began as the Calgary Buffaloes in 1966, and after stints in Billings, Nanaimo, and New Westminster, moved to the Tri-Cities for the 1988–89 season where they were rebranded as the "Americans".  Players are 16–20 years old and are generally considered to have amateur status, though they do receive nominal compensation and the organization is operated as a for-profit business.

Public lands
Like many Western counties, Benton County is home to considerable public lands acreage totaling about one-third of the county's total land area.  The most significant holding is the United States Department of Energy's Hanford Site, most of which has restricted public access.  However, Hanford does have a strong "nuclear tourism" element and certain Site facilities, such as the B Reactor, are a major attraction for history and engineering buffs.  Part of the Hanford Site acreage is also part of the Hanford Reach National Monument, which was established in 2000 by presidential proclamation.  Like with most of the rest of Hanford, most of the National Monument within Benton County is restricted from general public use.

Other federal land holdings in the county include small clusters of Bureau of Land Management, notably an aggregation along the Horse Heaven Hills south of Benton City that is popular with hikers; Fish and Wildlife Service-owned islands and shorelands that are parts of the Umatilla and McNary National Wildlife Refugues; and Army Corps of Engineers properties along the Columbia River, most of which are managed for habitat and recreation by the County and cities.

State-owned public lands are minimal in Benton County, with the Department of Fish and Wildlife's Rattlesnake Slope Wildlife Recreation Area north of Benton City being the most significant and a draw for hikers and equestrians.

Benton County and the cities also own numerous parklands and open spaces, most notable the Badger Mountain Centennial Preserve, a hiking destination managed by the County located south of Richland which draws over 200,000 visits per year.

Viticulture

The area of south-central Washington occupied by Benton County has been known primarily as an agricultural hub since its settlement.  The rise of viticulture has had a profound impact on the agricultural and tourism industries over the past two decades, and has in many ways reshaped the reputation of the region.

The Yakima Valley AVA, part of which is located in Benton County, was the first American Viticultural Area established within Washington state, gaining the recognition in 1983. As the Washington wine industry began to focus more on terroir, three sub-appellations have been created for areas within the Yakima Valley AVA that demonstrate unique microclimates and soil conditions which crafted different wines from their neighboring areas.  The Red Mountain AVA, which lies in its entirety on Benton County, was created in 2001. The county also includes part of the Horse Heaven Hills AVA which is part of the larger Columbia Valley AVA.

Sites of interest
Columbia Center Mall
Columbia Park
Hanford Reach National Monument: see also Hanford Reach Interpretive Center 
Hanford Site
 Ice Age Floods National Geologic Trail: Lake Lewis Section
 Irrigated Agriculture Research & Extension Center
Laser Interferometer Gravitational-Wave Observatory (LIGO)
McNary Dam
 Manhattan Project National Historical Park: B Reactor
Toyota Center (Three Rivers Coliseum)
 Walter Clore Wine & Culinary Center

Communities

Cities

Benton City
Kennewick
Prosser (County seat)
Richland
West Richland

Census-designated place
Finley

Other unincorporated communities

 Badger
 Berrian
 East White Bluffs
 Gibbon
 Highland
 Kiona
 Longview
 North Prosser
 Paterson
 Plymouth
 Whitstran

Ghost towns

Hanford
Horse Heaven
White Bluffs
Yellepit

See also
National Register of Historic Places listings in Benton County, Washington

References

Further reading
 William Denison Lyman, History of the Yakima Valley, Washington: Comprising Yakima, Kittitas, and Benton Counties. In Two Volumes. Chicago: S.J. Clarke Publishing Co., 1919. Volume 1 | Volume 2

External links
 Benton County (official website)
 East Benton County Historical Museum
 Tri-City Regional Chamber of Commerce

 
1905 establishments in Washington (state)
Populated places established in 1905
Tri-Cities, Washington
Eastern Washington